Ballindaggin, officially Ballindaggan is a small village in County Wexford, Ireland.

The local Roman Catholic church is dedicated to Saint Colman and was opened in 1864.

Ballindaggin is home to the local pub and shop Jordan's and the restaurant/bar the Holy Grail

References

See also
 List of towns and villages in Ireland

Towns and villages in County Wexford